The 2021 Bush's Beans 200 was the 18th stock car race of the 2021 ARCA Menards Series season, the eighth and final race of the 2021 ARCA Menards Series East season, the ninth race of the 2021 Sioux Chief Showdown, and the second iteration of the event. The race was held on Thursday, September 16, 2021 in Bristol, Tennessee, at Bristol Motor Speedway, a 0.533 miles (0.858 km) permanent oval-shaped racetrack. The race took the scheduled 200 laps to complete. At race's end, Ty Gibbs of Joe Gibbs Racing would win the race in dominating fashion, leading almost every lap and taking home his 18th career ARCA Menards Series win and his tenth of the season. Meanwhile, his teammate, Sammy Smith would come in second to clinch the 2021 ARCA Menards Series East championship, winning the championship by 34 points. To fill out the podium, Taylor Gray of David Gilliland Racing would finish third.

Background

Entry list

Practice 
The only 45-minute practice session was held on Thursday, September 16, at 2:30 PM EST.

Qualifying 
Qualifying was held on Thursday, September 16, at 4:30 PM EST. The qualifying system used was a timed session.

Full qualifying results

Race results

References 

2021 ARCA Menards Series
2021 ARCA Menards Series East
NASCAR races at Bristol Motor Speedway
Bush's Beans 200
Bush's Beans 200